Xylota philippinica is a species of hoverfly in the family Syrphidae.

Distribution
Philippines.

References

Eristalinae
Insects described in 1999
Diptera of Asia